Khlong Yong is one of three tambons (sub-districts) of Phutthamonthon District, Nakhon Pathom Province, on the outskirts of Bangkok in central Thailand.

Geography

Neighbouring tambons are (from the north clockwise): Naraphirom of Bang Len District; Nong Phrao Ngai of Sai Noi District; Ban Yai of Bang Yai District, Nonthaburi Province; and Salaya, Maha Sawat, Lan Tak Fa, and Bang Kaeo Fa of Nakhon Chai Si District.

This area has many khlongs ('canals') flowing through it, including Khlong Yong and Khlong Naraphirom.

History
Khlong Yong is considered the first community in the country. It received a community title deed to that effect on 12 February 2011 from the government of Abhisit Vejjajiva. Most Khlong Yong locals work in agriculture.

Administration
The tambon is divided into seven administrative mubans (villages) 

The area of the tambon is shared by local government, subdistrict-municipality Khlong Yong (เทศบาลตำบลคลองโยง).

References

External links

Tambon of Nakhon Pathom Province